Andrew Barisic (born 22 March 1986 in Canberra, ACT) is an Australian footballer who currently plays for Albury Wodonga Football Association side Wangaratta City.

Club career 
Born in Canberra, Barisic began his career in 2002 with the ACTAS before moving to Canberra Deakin in July 2003. In January 2004 he signed his first professional contract with Melbourne Knights, then left in the summer of 2006 for Europe and signed a contract for Germany-based Oberliga Nord club, Arminia Hannover.

On 13 December 2007 he signed with his former club Melbourne Knights in the Victorian Premier League. He impressed regularly, becoming a key member of their squad and scoring 19 goals in 21 games in the 2008 season.

Gold Coast United
On 10 December 2008 he was signed by Gold Coast United on a one-year contract. At Gold Coast United he made six appearances and scored one goal in his first season there. He was signed on for one further year. In his second season at GCU, he made 11 appearances and again scored one goal.

Persebaya1927
After leaving Gold Coast, "Bara" signed for Indonesian side Persebaya Surabaya in the Indonesian Premier League. He did very well there, scoring 11 in 14 games.

Arema Malang
He then signed for another Indonesia Super League side, this time Arema Cronus F.C., where he managed 8 goals in 15 appearances.

East Bengal 
 Andrew officially signed for East Bengal on 10 January 2013. He then made his debut for East Bengal on 25 January 2013, coming on as a 59th-minute substitute for Manandeep Singh, against Pune F.C. at the Balewadi Sports Complex in which East Bengal won 2–1. On 3 April 2013, he scored brace in 2013 AFC Cup against Singaporean opponent Tampines Rovers in group stage match. He again scored in same competition against a Vietnamese opponent Xuan Thanh Saigon in last group stage match, after winning that match East Bengal tops the group and qualified for the knockout stage of AFC Cup. On 8 May, he scored his 1st goal in the 2012–13 I-League in a 6–0 win over United Sikkim F.C. He ended his one-year stint with East Bengal with 15 goals in 22 matches.

Return to Melbourne Knights
He returned to Melbourne Knights for their 2013 VPL campaign, while the majority of the rest of Asia was in off-season. He managed 7 goals in 8 games in his third stint with the Knights.

South China 
On 31 December 2013, Barisic signed for South China. At South China, Barisic managed 13 goals in 18 appearances, 6 in the Hong Kong PL, 2 in AFC Qualification and 1 in the Senior Challenge Shield.

Kerala Blasters FC
Barisic then signed for newly formed Kerala Blasters FC in the newly formed Indian Super League. In the ISL side, Barisic managed 11 appearances in which Kerala came 2nd.

Return to Melbourne Knights
Barisic returned for the 4th time to Melbourne Knights in January 2015 scoring 12 goals in 16 games.

Eastern Sports Club
On 1 July 2015 Andrew Signed with Hong Kong Premier League Side Eastern.

Club statistics

Honours

Gold Coast Knights 

 Gold Coast Premier League Premiership: 2017, 2018
 Gold Coast Premier League Championship: 2018

Individual 

 Gold Coast Premier League Golden Boot: 2017

References

External links
 Gold Coast United profile
 OzFootball profile

1986 births
Living people
Australian people of Croatian descent
Soccer players from Melbourne
Australian expatriate soccer players
Australian expatriate sportspeople in Germany
Australian expatriate sportspeople in India
Expatriate footballers in Germany
Expatriate footballers in Hong Kong
Expatriate footballers in Indonesia
Gold Coast United FC players
Melbourne Knights FC players
A-League Men players
National Premier Leagues players
I-League players
East Bengal Club players
Expatriate footballers in India
Hong Kong Premier League players
South China AA players
Eastern Sports Club footballers
Kerala Blasters FC players
Association football forwards
Indian Super League players
Australian soccer players